Ugandinella is a monotypic genus of Ugandan ant-mimicking jumping spiders containing the single species, Ugandinella formicula. It was first described by Wanda Wesołowska in 2006, and is found in Uganda. The name is derived from the type locality, and the species name refers to their appearance similar to members of Formicidae.

References

Endemic fauna of Uganda
Arthropods of Uganda
Monotypic Salticidae genera
Salticidae
Spiders of Africa
Taxa named by Wanda Wesołowska